Kidston is a surname. Notable people with the surname include:

Annabel Kidston (1896–1981), Scottish artist 
Cath Kidston (born 1958), English fashion designer, businesswoman and writer
David Kidston (1859–1909), Scottish rugby union player
Glen Kidston (1899–1931), English aviator and racing driver
Home Kidston (1910–1996), Royal Navy officer, farmer and racing driver
Robert Kidston (1852–1924), Scottish palaeobiologist
Simon Kidston (born 1967), British classic car dealer
William Kidston (1849–1919), Australian politician
William Kidston (Canadian politician) (1816–1882), Canadian politician
William Hamilton Kidston (1852–1929), Scottish rugby union player